Giovanni Battista Coriolano (1590–1649) was an Italian engraver of the Baroque period.

He was almost certainly the son of the German transplant to Italy, the engraver Cristoforo Coriolano. Giovanni Battista was born and died in Bologna. He studied painting under Giovanni Luigi Valesio, but found little work painting in churches at Bologna. He painted a St. Nicholas and  a St. Bruno for the church of Santa Anna; and an altarpiece of Saints John, James, & Bernard for the Nunziata.

He was more successful as an engraver, the main familial profession, and worked both on wood and on copper. His engravings in chiaroscuro are dated from 1619 to 1625. In style they recall  Francesco Villamena. They include:
Portrait of  Vincenzo Sgualdi
Fortunius Licetus
Joannes Cottunius
Image of the Virgin
Miraculous Image of Virgin painted by St. Luke, held by 3 angels  and  Cupid sleeping after Reni
Virgin and Child, & St. John after Alessandro Tiarini
Christ crowned with thorns; etched in imitation of a woodcut after Lodovico Carracci
Triumphal Arch in honor of Louis XIII

He also engraved a number of theses and frontispieces.

References

1590 births
1649 deaths
Italian engravers
Italian Baroque painters
Painters from Bologna
Catholic engravers